Samuel Butcher PC (9 October 1811 – 29 July 1876) was an Irish Anglican bishop in the Church of Ireland in the 19th century.

Butcher was born in Danesfort, County Kilkenny, the son of Samuel Butcher, a distinguished naval commander, and Elizabeth Anne Herbert. He graduated from Trinity College Dublin in 1829He was educated at Trinity College Dublin. and joined the clergy of the Church of Ireland.

Between 1837 and 1852 he was a Fellow of Trinity College, Dublin and in 1849 and became a Doctor of Divinity. He was Professor of Ecclesiastical History at Trinity College in 1850, before working as Professor of Divinity from 1852 to 1866. He was the Rector of Ballymoney, County Antrim between 1854 and 1866. In 1866 Butcher became Bishop of Meath, and was subsequently made a member of the Privy Council of Ireland.

Butcher married Mary Leahy, daughter of John Leahy, on 23 November 1847. Together they had six children. His second son was John Butcher, 1st Baron Danesfort and his eldest daughter married Thomas Spring Rice, 2nd Baron Monteagle of Brandon. Butcher caused controversy in Anglo-Irish society when he committed suicide on 29 July 1876. The inquest into his death decided that this was the result of a temporary insanity brought on by fever.

Works
The Ecclesiastical Calendar: Its theory and construction, Dublin: 1877. Edited and published posthumously by his sons Samuel Henry Butcher and John George Butcher.

References

1811 births
1876 deaths
Academics of Trinity College Dublin
Fellows of Trinity College Dublin
19th-century Anglican bishops in Ireland
Anglican bishops of Meath
Members of the Privy Council of Ireland
Regius Professors of Divinity (University of Dublin)